"Keep It Real" is a song by American hip hop recording artist Miilkbone, released as the first single from his debut studio album Da' Miilkrate in 1995. The song reached number 81 on the Billboard U.S. R&B charts and received praise from The Source magazine. It is widely hailed as a classic song and is recognized for its unique piano sample which has been most famously used by rappers Big L and Jay Z on their legendary freestyle on the Stretch & Bobbito Show in 1995. Rapper Logic also used the beat for his song Young Sinatra III on his 2012 mixtape Young Sinatra: Undeniable.

Formats and track listings
These are the formats and track listings of major single releases of "Keep It Real".
CD Maxi single
"Keep It Real (Foul Mouth LP)
"Keep It Real (Instrumental)
"Keep It Real (Dirty Raw Shit)
"How Ya Like It? (Sour Milk LP)
"How Ya Like It? (Instrumental)

12" single
"Keep It Real (Foul Mouth LP)
"Keep It Real (Instrumental)
"Keep It Real (Dirty Raw Shit)
"Keep It Real (Censored LP)
"How Ya Like It ? (Sour Milk LP)
"How Ya Like It ? (Instrumental)

References

 100 Best Hip Hop One Hit Wonders Complex. Retrieved April 22, 2015
 Vibe Magazine (November 1995) p.123 Vibe Retrieved April 22, 2015

1994 songs
1995 singles
Capitol Records singles
American hip hop songs
Black-and-white music videos